Thomas Gray was an English poet, classical scholar and professor of Cambridge University.

Thomas Gray may also refer to:

 Thomas Grey (chronicler) (died 1369), chronicler, whose surname is often spelled 'Gray'
 Thomas Gray (1788–1848), British railway advocate
 Thomas Gray (VC) (1914–1940), English recipient of the Victoria Cross
 Thomas Gray (rower) (born 1936), Canadian Olympic rower
 Thomas Gray (surveyor) (1832–1890), Board of Trade
 Thomas Gray (soccer) (born 1986), American soccer player
 Thomas Cecil Gray (1913–2008), English anaesthetist
 Thomas Lomar Gray (1850–1908), British engineer
 Thomas Ruffin Gray (1800– 1830s), American lawyer and author
 Tom Gray (born 1941), American bluegrass musician
 Tom Gray (rock musician) (1951–2021), American musician with Delta Moon
 Tom Gray (British musician), English rock singer, composer, and activist
 Tom Gray (footballer, born 1875) (1875–1944), English footballer
 Tom Gray (speed skater) (born 1945), American Olympic speed skater
 Tommy Gray (1913–1992), Scottish footballer and football club manager
 Tommy Gray (rugby union) (1917–2000), Scotland international rugby union player

See also
 Thomas Grey (disambiguation)
 "Tom Gray's Dream", poem